Kevin Jackson (3 January 1955 – 10 May 2021) was an English writer, broadcaster, filmmaker and pataphysician.

He was educated at the Emanuel School, Battersea, and Pembroke College, Cambridge. After teaching in the English Department of Vanderbilt University, Nashville, he joined the BBC, first as a producer in radio and then as a director of short documentaries for television. In 1987 he was recruited to the Arts pages of The Independent. He was a freelance writer since the early 1990s and was a regular contributor to BBC radio programmes, including Radio 4's Saturday Review.

Jackson often collaborated on projects with, among others, the film-maker Kevin Macdonald, with whom he co-produced a Channel 4 documentary on Humphrey Jennings, The Man Who Listened to Britain (2000); with the cartoonist Hunt Emerson, on comic strips about the history of Western occultism for Fortean Times, on two comics inspired by John Ruskin (published by the Ruskin Foundation) and on a book-length version of Dante's Inferno (Knockabout Books, 2012); with the musician and composer Colin Minchin (lyrics for various songs, and the rock opera Bite, first staged in West London, October 2011); and with the songwriter Peter Blegvad (short surreal plays for BBC Radio 3 – eartoons). Jackson also conducted a long biographical interview with Blegvad, published by Atlas Press in September 2011 as The Bleaching Stream. Jackson appears, under his own name, as a semi-fictional character in Iain Sinclair's account of a pedestrian journey around the M25, London Orbital. Worple Press published Jackson's book of interviews with Sinclair, The Verbals in 2002.

He was among the founder members of the London Institute of 'Pataphysics, and held the Ordre de la Grande Gidouille from the College de Pataphysique in Paris. He was also a Fellow of the Royal Society of Arts and a Companion of the Guild of St George. From 2009–2011 he was Visiting Professor in English at University College London.

Jackson died on 10 May 2021, at the age of 66.

Select bibliography

As author 

 The Language of Cinema, published by Routledge Press 1998
 Invisible Forms: A Guide to Literary Curiosities, published by St Martin's Press 2000
 Building the Great Pyramid, Published by Firefly Books 2003
 Letters of Introduction, Published by  Carcanet Press Ltd 2004
 Humphrey Jennings, Published by Picador Press 2004
 A Ruskin Alphabet, Published by  Worple Press 2000
 Withnail & I (BFI Modern Classics), 2008
 Lawrence of Arabia (BFI Modern Classics), 2007
 Fast, 2006
 Moose, Published by Reaktion Books 2009
 Bite: A Vampire Handbook, Published by Portobello Books Ltd 2010
 The Pataphysical Flook, 2007
 The Worlds of John Ruskin, Published by Pallas Athene Arts 2009
 Chronicles of Old London, Published by Museyon Guides 2012
 Constellation of Genius, Published by Hutchinson Press 2012
 Nosferatu (1922): eine Symphonie des Grauens (BFI Film Classics), published by British Film Institute 2013
 Carnal, published by Pallas Athene Arts 2015
Mayflower: The Voyage from Hell published by TSB | Can of Worms, 2020
Darwin’s Odyssey: The Voyage of the Beagle published by TSB | Can of Worms, 2020
The Queen’s Pirate: Sir Francis Drake and the Golden Hind published by TSB | Can of Worms, 2019
Nelson’s Victory: Trafalgar and Tragedy published by TSB | Can of Worms, 2021

As editor 

 Schrader on Schrader, 2004
 The Humphrey Jennings Film Reader, Published by Carcanet Press 2005
 The Oxford Book of Money, 1995
 The Risk of Being Alive. Dylan Francis
 The Anatomy of Melancholy. (Robert Burton), 2004
 Revolutionary Sonnets and Other Poems (Anthony Burgess), 2003
 The Book of Hours, 2007
 Aussie Dans Le Metro: A Festschrift for John Baxter (privately published: Alces Press, 2009),

As co-editor 

 Pataphysics: Definitions and Citations. (with Alastair Brotchie, Stanley Chapman and Thieri Foulc), 2003

Filmography

Shorts 

 Bite: Diary of a Vampire Housewife, 2009
 Bite: Pavane for a Vampire Queen, 2011
 No More a-Roving (Vampire Mix), 2011
 Exquisite Corpse (from the novel by Robert Irwin), 2011
 The Last of the Vostyachs (from the novel by Diego Marani), 2012
 Constellation of Genius, 2012
 Dracbeth, 2014
 Carnal to the Point of Scandal, 2015

References

Reviews

External links 
 The London Institute of 'Pataphysics
 The Worple Press
 Carcanet Press
 The Final Journey of a Working Writer, by Kevin Jackson in the Independent
 A Polymath's Polymath: A Conversation with Kevin Jackson
 Author Bio at Portobello Books
 

1955 births
2021 deaths
British radio personalities
British writers
Alumni of Pembroke College, Cambridge
Vanderbilt University faculty
Film people from London
Writers from London
20th-century British male writers
21st-century British male writers